Catherine L. Albanese (born 1940) is an American religious studies scholar, professor, lecturer, and author.  Born and raised in Philadelphia, Pennsylvania, she graduated summa cum laude with a Bachelor of Arts from Chestnut Hill College in 1962. She received her Master’s Degree in History from Duquesne University in 1968, and completed her Doctorate for History of Christianity at the University of Chicago in 1972.

She taught Religious Studies at the University of California-Santa Barbara, and served as chair of the department. She was influential in founding the North American Religions Section of the American Academy of Religion (AAR) in the 1970s.  In 1994, she was elected president of the AAR.

She is the author of the religion textbook America: Religions and Religion, which is in its fifth edition.  Other books she has authored include Corresponding Motion: Transcendental Religion and the New America (1977), Nature Religion in America: From the Algonkian Indians to the New Age (1990), and A Republic of Mind and Spirit: A Cultural History of American Metaphysical Religion (2007). She edited The Spirituality of the American Transcendentalists: Selected Writings of Ralph Waldo Emerson, Amos Bronson Alcott, Theodore Parker and Henry David Thoreau, which was published in 1988.

Albanese was elected a member of the American Academy of Arts and Science in 2014.

As of October 2021, Albanese is the Distinguished Emerita Professor of Religious Studies at the University of California-Santa Barbara.

References

Living people
1940 births
American historians
Educators from Philadelphia
University of Chicago alumni